Armyworms are the caterpillars of some members of two genera:

 Many Spodoptera including:
 African armyworm (Spodoptera exempta) (Africa)
 Fall armyworm (Spodoptera frugiperda) (North and South America)
 Lawn armyworm (Spodoptera mauritia)
 Some Mythimna including:
 Common armyworm or true armyworm (Mythimna unipuncta) (North and South America)
 Northern armyworm, Oriental armyworm or rice ear-cutting caterpillar (Mythimna separata) (Asia)

Animal common name disambiguation pages